This is a comprehensive list of songs recorded by Welsh rock band Stereophonics. This list includes songs from the band's ten studio albums, one compilation album, one live album, B-sides from twenty-three of forty singles plus other featured appearances.

As the first act signed to V2 Records, Stereophonics started officially releasing songs in 1996 with their first double A-side single, "Looks like Chaplin", which was not applicable to chart. Their second single, "Local Boy in the Photograph", charted at number fifty-one on the UK Singles Chart and has since been viewed as a classic. The debut album Word Gets Around was released in 1997 and reached number six in the UK Albums Chart. At the 1998 Brit Awards the band were nominated for "Best British Newcomer" and at the NME Brat Awards for "Best New Band", subsequently winning the former.

The band gained commercial success after "The Bartender and the Thief", the lead-single from the follow-up to Word Gets Around, reached number three and remains one of their highest charting singles.

Songs

See also
Stereophonics discography

References
Notes

Footnotes

Bibliography

External links
Stereophonics discography at Stereophonics.com

Stereophonics